Current River may refer to:

Canada

 Current River (Ontario), a tributary of Lake Superior in Thunder Bay
 Current River, Thunder Bay, Ontario, a neighborhood

United States

 Current River (Ozarks), a tributary of the Black River in Missouri
 Current River State Park, Shannon County, Missouri
 Current River Township, Ripley County, Missouri